Uppingham School is a public school (English fee-charging boarding and day school for pupils 13-18) in Uppingham, Rutland, England, founded in 1584 by Robert Johnson, the Archdeacon of Leicester, who also established Oakham School. The headmaster, Richard J. Maloney, belongs to the Headmasters' and Headmistresses' Conference and the school to the Rugby Group of British independent schools. Edward Thring was the school's best-known headmaster (in 1853–1887). His curriculum changes were adopted in other English public schools. John Wolfenden, headmaster from 1934 to 1944, chaired the Wolfenden Committee, whose report recommending the decriminalisation of homosexuality appeared in 1957. Uppingham has a musical tradition based on work by Paul David and Robert Sterndale Bennett. It has the biggest playing-field area of any school in England, in three separate areas of the town: Leicester to the west, Middle to the south, and Upper to the east.

History

In 1584 Uppingham School was founded with a hospital, or almshouse, by Archdeacon Robert Johnson. The original 1584 schoolroom in Uppingham churchyard is still owned by the school and is a Grade I listed building. The original hospital building is now incorporated in the School Library.

The first recorded Uppingham schoolboy was Henry Ferne from York, who was chaplain to Charles I. Another prominent early schoolboy was the Jesuit Anthony Turner, one of the martyrs of the Popish Plot.

In the 17th, 18th and early 19th centuries Uppingham remained a small school of 30–60 pupils, with two staff. Despite its small size, pupils then regularly gained places and scholarships to Oxford and Cambridge universities.

During that period, various lasting features of life in the school developed. It became a full boarding school, with all pupils having individual studies. This pattern was set around 1800 and some of the original studies survive, although no longer used as such. The first recorded school play was performed in 1794 and Uppingham has a thriving theatre. The main recreation in the 19th century was cricket – the first recorded cricket match, described in the school magazine, was in 1815 – and the game still thrives there. In 1846 the institution of school praepostors, or prefects, was established. The praepostors are called "pollies" around the school. One of the earliest Old Boys to gain fame was Thomas Bonney, a pupil in the 1850s, who became the most distinguished geologist of his time, and president of the Alpine Club.

Until at least 1853, the school was known as "Uppingham Grammar School."

Edward Thring transformed the school from a small, local grammar school into a large, well-known public school, with 330 pupils. During his headship on 4 April 1876 the entire school, consisting of 300 boys, thirty masters, and their families, moved temporarily to Borth in Wales after an outbreak of typhoid ravaged the town as a result of the poorly maintained water system. In Borth the school took over the disused Cambrian Hotel and a number of boarding houses, remaining there for fourteen months. The move was successful in saving the school from a serious epidemic. The move to Borth is commemorated in an annual service held in the school chapel.

Thring also won national and transatlantic reputation as an original thinker and writer on education. At a time when mathematics and classics dominated the curriculum, he encouraged many ‘extra' subjects: French, German, science, history, art, carpentry, and music. In particular, Thring was a pioneer in his introduction of music into the regular system of education.

He also opened the first gymnasium in an English school, the forerunner of the present sports hall, and later added a heated indoor swimming pool. He also commissioned a number of buildings, notably the chapel designed by the Gothic Revival architect G. E. Street.

Ernest William Hornung was at the school in the 1880s; he wrote several novels but his fame rests upon his creation of the character A. J. Raffles.

During this period the school continued to grow, with numbers reaching well over 400. These years saw the formation in 1889 of the Combined Cadet Force; the creation in 1890 of the first school orchestra; in 1896 the re-introduction of hockey; and the adoption of rugby football, with the first match being against Rugby. Uppingham pupils still take part in all these activities today.

The buildings of the school also continued to grow with the construction of the tower block, through which one still enters the school, and the combined gymnasium and concert hall, which in 1972 was converted into the school theatre.

Uppingham School had been attended by three out of the four First-World-War victims Vera Brittain included as her correspondents in her much-praised Letters from a Lost Generation.

Throughout the Second World War the buildings of Kingswood School in Bath were used by the Admiralty for strategic planning. During that time Kingswood School lodged with Uppingham School sharing Uppingham's resources.

Pupils have continued to go on to later fame – Patrick Abercrombie, pioneer town planner; Sir Malcolm Campbell, motor racer; James Elroy Flecker, poet and playwright: CRW Nevinson, official war artist in both world wars; WH Pratt (Boris Karloff), film actor; E.J. Moeran, composer; Lt General Sir Brian Horrocks, Commander of the XXX Corps under Montgomery, and later a TV lecturer on battles and war; and Percy Chapman, captain of the England cricket team 1926–30, who won the Ashes.

The growth of the school continued with numbers of well over 600 pupils being reached in the 1960s. In 1973 the first girl attended Uppingham, as a day-girl; with a few more added in 1974. Then in 1975 the first sixth form girls' house, Fairfield, was opened, with its full complement of 50 girls achieved by 1976. This venture proved so successful that in 1986 a second girls' house, Johnson's, was opened; and in 1994 the Lodge House (formerly a boys' house) was converted into the third girls' house. In 2001 the first 13-year-old girls entered the school, with the opening of a new house, Samworths', the first house for girls aged 13–18; followed in 2002 by the conversion of Fairfield into a second house for 13–18-year-old girls and another new house, New House, opened in 2004. Johnson's was converted to a 13–18 girls' house in 2011 with an extension and significant internal reconstruction.

The buildings of the school continued to expand. The First World War took the lives of 450 ex-pupils and the school hall was built in their memory. Also built in this period were the main classroom block in the centre of the school, the cricket and rugby pavilions, and a school sanatorium. In 1956 a new science block was opened by the Prince Philip, Duke of Edinburgh; it was extended in the 1960s. In 1989 a new maths block for mathematics and computing was opened by Stephen Hawking. New squash courts were built and in 1970 the sports centre, incorporating the old swimming pool, was opened, with the later addition of a climbing wall and a weights room. In 1981 came a new music school and a new buttery, where the pupils can buy snacks. In 1995 a new arts and design faculty was built, the Leonardo Centre, designed by an old pupil, Piers Gough. In 2003 a language centre (TLC) opened to house all the modern-language classrooms. In 2006 a third music facility, the Paul David Music School (PDMS), opened in School Lane, incorporating all the old houses that were there, to accommodate the growing demand for music at the school. In 2010 the Uppingham School Sports Centre (USSC) was completed, and the old sports centre demolished to create space to develop the new science centre, all part of the new "Western Quad".

In the post-war period, sports other than the main ones of rugby, hockey, cricket, athletics, swimming and shooting began to be introduced including tennis, basketball, badminton, fencing, squash, sailing, soccer and golf.

In 1945 Douglas Guest succeeded Robert Sterndale Bennett as Director of Music and this area of school life developed further. The concert choir was expanded to involve over half the school: a bandmaster was appointed; music scholarships were introduced; and various music societies were created. All these innovations remain. Recently the school's music facilities have been improved again. The school houses two large three-manual pipe organs, in the memorial hall and the chapel, the latter one being rebuilt in the summer of 2007 by Nicholson Organs of Malvern. A new choir division appears high on the south wall, and a new console and action have been installed, along with new pipework. The organ is notable for a smooth Harrison tone and a rare pair of independent sets of Swell shutters – one opening west into the nave extension and one south across the repositioned choir stalls.

In the 1960s Uppingham pioneered the introduction of design and technology into the curriculum, with Uppingham being the first independent school, and one of the first 5 schools in Britain, to evolve and introduce A-level design. Design was taught in the Thring Centre, opened in 1965. These subjects were then transferred with art, woodwork and metalwork to the Leonardo Centre, opened in 1995.

The years since the 1970s have also seen a considerable expansion in the subjects taught, particularly at A-level, with the introduction of politics, ancient history, design, business studies, theatre studies, classical civilisation, Spanish, Italian, philosophy & religious studies, ICT and physical education.

Uppingham has one of the largest private theatres in the country, in a building based on the original Leipzig Gewandhaus. An extension to the main theatre houses a drama studio to be used for the teaching of theatre studies as well as for performances of smaller productions. There is also a large workshop to provide storage and workspace for technical equipment.

Recent developments
In 2005 the school was one of fifty of the country's leading independent schools which were fined for exchanging information on planned fee increases, exposed by The Times. Each school was required to pay a nominal penalty of £10,000 and all agreed to make ex-gratia payments totalling three million pounds into a trust designed to benefit pupils who attended the schools during the period in respect of which fee information was shared. However, Jean Scott, the head of the Independent Schools Council, said that independent schools had always been exempt from anti-cartel rules applied to business, were following a long-established procedure in sharing the information with each other, and that they were unaware of the change to the law (on which they had not been consulted). She wrote to John Vickers, the OFT director-general, saying, "They are not a group of businessmen meeting behind closed doors to fix the price of their products to the disadvantage of the consumer. They are schools that have quite openly continued to follow a long-established practice because they were unaware that the law had changed."

In May 2010, a pupil rebellion was staged over the expulsion of several sixth-form pupils. For a day, 500 pupils failed to attend classes and formed protests in aid of the dismissed pupils.

In March 2011, twice Olympic gold medalist Sebastian Coe officially opened the school's new sports centre. The building includes a large sports hall, 25m swimming pool, a 50-station fitness studio, squash courts, gymnasium and two dance studios. It was designed by ORMS Architecture Design and is part of the school's plans to develop the western campus buildings. The school also now has, in a converted squash court behind the theatre, a climbing wall facility, installed in 2010.

In November 2014, Sir Alec Jeffreys officially opened the school's new science centre which, along with an extension to the Leonardo Centre, completed the new 'Western Quad'.

In 2018, the cricket pavilion was listed as Grade II by Historic England.

International schools have been announced for Vietnam and Cairo, Egypt with scheduled openings in September 2023 and September 2024 respectively.

Academic results
In 2019, 45% of pupils scored A*-A for their A-Levels examination, whereas 70% scored A*-A for their GCSEs.

Houses
There are nine boys' boarding houses at Uppingham, informally split into three groups:
The 'Hill Houses' are Brooklands, Fircroft and Highfield (1863);
The 'Town Houses' are School House, Lorne House, West Deyne (1859) and West Bank (1866);
The 'Country Houses' are Meadhurst and Farleigh.

There are six girls' boarding houses: Johnson's, The Lodge (sixth form only), Fairfield, New House, Constables and Samworths'. Samworths' was built in 2001 as the first house for girls aged 13 to 18. It was named after the Samworth Brothers, Old Uppinghamians who helped to finance the construction.

Quatercentenary
Elizabeth II visited the school on the occasion of the quatercentenary, on 16 November 1984.

Old Uppinghamians

For a list of notable alumni, see List of Old Uppinghamians

Military
Five Old Uppinghamians have won the Victoria Cross:
In the First World War:
Arthur Moore Lascelles
George Allen Maling
 Thomas Harold Broadbent Maufe
 John Stanhope Collings-Wells
In the Second World War:
Willward Alexander Sandys-Clarke

Headmasters
1641–1666: Francis Meres
1840–1853: Henry Holden
1853–1887: Edward Thring (1821–1887) 
1887–1907: Edward Carus Selwyn
1907–1915: Harry Ward McKenzie, later head of Durham School
1916–1934: Reginald Owen (1887–1961), later Archbishop of New Zealand
1934–1944: John Wolfenden, later Lord Wolfenden
1944–1965: Martin Lloyd
1965-1975: John Caress Royds
1975–1982: Coll Macdonald
1982–1991: Nicholas Raymond Bomford
1991–2006: Stephen Winkley
2006–2016: Richard Harman
2016– : Richard Maloney, previously head of Bede's School

Notable staff
George Howson (1886–1900), reforming headmaster of Gresham's School
Hugh Jackman (1987), actor (assistant master, PE teacher)
Chris Read, former England cricketer
Nick De Luca, former Scottish rugby player
Tyrone Howe, former Irish and Lions rugby player

Southern Railway Schools Class
The 24th steam locomotive (Engine 923) in the Southern Railway's class V (of which there were 40) was originally named Uppingham, but the name was changed after objections from the school.

This class was also known as the Schools Class because all 40 of the class were named after prominent English public schools. 'Uppingham', as it was called, was built in December 1933 and had its name changed to Bradfield on 14 August 1934.

References

External links
Uppingham School website

Boarding schools in Rutland

Member schools of the Headmasters' and Headmistresses' Conference
Private schools in Rutland
1584 establishments in England
Educational institutions established in the 1580s
Uppingham
Schools cricket
Church of England private schools in the Diocese of Peterborough